MS Kenora is a cruise ship that operates in Kenora, Northwestern Ontario, Canada.

History
It was built in 1969, in Selkirk, Manitoba by former Riverton Boat Works in Riverton, Manitoba. It started out as a freighter supplying northern communities on Lake Winnipeg.

Service
The cruise operates on Lake of the Woods and docks at Kenora's waterfront.

References

External links 
M.S. Kenora 

Kenora
Kenora
Transport in Kenora